The 2013–14 Northern Iowa Panthers men's basketball team represented the University of Northern Iowa during the 2013–14 NCAA Division I men's basketball season. The Panthers, led by eighth year head coach Ben Jacobson, played their home games at McLeod Center and were members of the Missouri Valley Conference. They last played in the Missouri Valley Tournament where they lost to the Southern Illinois Salukis in the quarterfinals

Roster

Schedule

|-
!colspan=9 style="background:#660099; color:#FFD700;"| Exhibition

|-
!colspan=9 style="background:#660099; color:#FFD700;"| Regular season

|-
!colspan=9 style="background:#660099; color:#FFD700;"| 2014 Missouri Valley tournament

References

Northern Iowa Panthers men's basketball seasons
Northern Iowa
Panth
Panth